Havuzlu is a village in the Ovacık District, Tunceli Province, Turkey. The village is populated by Kurds of non-tribal affiliation and had a population of 19 in 2021.

The hamlets of Arzular and Karataş are attached to the village.

References 

Kurdish settlements in Tunceli Province
Villages in Ovacık District